Wardha Assembly constituency is one of the 288 Vidhan Sabha (legislative assembly) constituencies in Maharashtra state in western India, and is a segment of Wardha Lok Sabha constituency. This constituency is one of the four Vidhan Sabha constituencies in the Wardha district and comprises parts of the Wardha and Seloo tehsils of this district.

Wardha (वर्धा) is the 2nd biggest Assembly constituency in Wardha district after the Hinganghat Assembly constituency.

List of members of legislative assembly

Election Results

1962 Vidhan Sabha Elections
 Bapuraoji Marotrao Deshmukh (INC) : 22,275 votes
 Ramchandra Marotrao Ghangare (CPI) : 11,579

2014 Vidhan Sabha Elections
 Pankaj Rajesh Bhoyar (BJP)
 Shekhar Shende (Congress)

See also
 Wardha
 Seloo
 List of constituencies of Maharashtra Vidhan Sabha

References

Assembly constituencies of Maharashtra
Wardha district